In mathematics, an analytic manifold, also known as a  manifold, is a differentiable manifold with analytic transition maps. The term usually refers to real analytic manifolds, although complex manifolds are also analytic. In algebraic geometry, analytic spaces are a generalization of analytic manifolds such that singularities are permitted.

For , the space of analytic functions, consists of infinitely differentiable functions , such that the Taylor series

 

The requirement that the transition maps be analytic is significantly more restrictive than that they be infinitely differentiable; the analytic manifolds are a proper subset of the smooth, i.e. , manifolds. There are many similarities between the theory of analytic and smooth manifolds, but a critical difference is that analytic manifolds do not admit analytic partitions of unity, whereas smooth partitions of unity are an essential tool in the study of smooth manifolds. A fuller description of the definitions and general theory can be found at differentiable manifolds, for the real case, and at complex manifolds, for the complex case.

See also
 Complex manifold
 Analytic variety

References

Structures on manifolds
Manifolds